Rolaniconus is a synonym of Conus (Strategoconus) da Motta, 1991 represented as Conus Linnaeus, 1758. These consist of sea snails, marine gastropod mollusks in the family Conidae, the cone snails and their allies.

Species
 Rolaniconus athenae (Filmer, 2011): synonym of  Conus athenae Filmer, 2011
 Rolaniconus axelrodi (Walls, 1978) represented as Conus axelrodi Walls, 1978 (alternate representation)
 Rolaniconus balteatus (G.B. Sowerby, 1833) represented as Conus balteatus G. B. Sowerby II, 1833 (alternate representation)
 Rolaniconus boeticus (Reeve, 1844) represented as Conus boeticus Reeve, 1844 (alternate representation)
 Rolaniconus buniatus Bozzetti, 2013: synonym of  Conus buniatus (Bozzetti, 2013)
 Rolaniconus coccineus (Gmelin, 1791) represented as Conus coccineus Gmelin, 1791 (alternate representation)
 Rolaniconus danilai (Röckel & Korn, 1990) represented as Conus danilai Röckel & Korn, 1990 (alternate representation)
 Rolaniconus dedonderi Goethaels & D. Monsecour, 2013: synonym of  Conus dedonderi (Goethaels & D. Monsecour, 2013)
 Rolaniconus empressae (Lorenz, 2001) represented as Conus empressae Lorenz, 2001 (alternate representation)
 Rolaniconus gilberti Bozzetti, 2012: synonym of  Conus gilberti (Bozzetti, 2012)
 Rolaniconus hamamotoi (Yoshiba & Koyoma, 1984) represented as Conus hamamotoi Yoshiba & Koyama, 1984 (alternate representation)
 Rolaniconus hanshassi (Lorenz & Barbier, 2012): synonym of  Conus hanshassi (Lorenz & Barbier, 2012)
 Rolaniconus helgae (Blöcher, 1992) represented as Conus helgae Blöcher, 1992 (alternate representation)
 Rolaniconus hivanus (Moolenbeek, Zandbergen & Bouchet, 2008): synonym of  Conus hivanus Moolenbeek, Zandbergen & Bouchet, 2008
 Rolaniconus lecourtorum Lorenz, 2011: synonym of  Conus lecourtorum (Lorenz, 2011)
 Rolaniconus montillai (Röckel, 1985) represented as Conus montillai Röckel, 1985 (alternate representation)
 Rolaniconus nimbosus (Hwass in Bruguière, 1792) represented as Conus nimbosus Hwass in Bruguière, 1792 (alternate representation)
 Rolaniconus polongimarumai (Kosuge, 1980) represented as Conus polongimarumai Kosuge, 1980 (alternate representation)
 Rolaniconus suduirauti (Raybaudi Massilia, 2004) represented as Conus suduirauti Raybaudi Massilia, 2004 (alternate representation)
 Rolaniconus varius (Linnaeus, 1758) represented as Conus varius Linnaeus, 1758 (alternate representation)

References

External links
 To World Register of Marine Species

Conidae